Chakeri is a railway station in Chakeri, a suburb of Kanpur. It lies on the Delhi–Howrah line. Its station code is CHK. {SS(ststion spritendent)= Vakas Ahmad} 
{SM(station master)=Shivam raj}
{SM=Vipul rai}
{SM=S.k Gupta}
{T.I(Traffic inspector)=Pandey}
{(STBS)station ticket booking sevak}=Abhay Dwivedi

Gallery

References 

Railway stations in Kanpur Nagar district
Allahabad railway division